Longineu Parsons may refer to:
 Longineu Parsons II, a trumpeter and music educator
 Longineu W. Parsons III, a drummer and former member of Yellowcard